Arthur Österwall (Sven Artur Österwall, 6 March 1910, in Stockholm, Sweden – 27 February 1990, in Stockholm) was a Swedish band leader, composer, vocalist and musician (double bass). Österwall first appeared in his brother Seymour Österwall's orchestra but in 1944 formed his own orchestra. He was also a jazz columnist and entertainment reporter

Discography
 1942: I gult och blått (The yellow and blue)
 1941: Hem från Babylon (Home from Babylon)

Filmography
 1983: Åke Hasselgård Story (Ake Hazel Farm Story)
 1943: Flickan är ett fynd (The girl is a bargain)
 1941: Gatans serenad (Street Serenade)

References 

1910 births
1990 deaths
Swedish composers
Swedish male composers
Jazz bandleaders
20th-century composers
Swedish jazz double-bassists
20th-century double-bassists
20th-century Swedish male musicians
20th-century Swedish musicians
Male jazz musicians